Hope is a  2006 Telugu film directed by Satish Kasetty. The film was showcased at International Film Festival of India in 2008. As director, he has won the National Film Award for Best Film on Other Social Issues. He was the jury member for South Region II at the 59th National Film Awards.

Plot
The film  deals with Teenage suicides, and educational stress in teenagers in South India.

Awards
 National Film Award for Best Film on Other Social Issues - 2007
 Jury award from SICA for best film- 2007

References

External links
 http://www.idlebrain.com/celeb/interview/ksatish.html

2006 films
2000s Telugu-language films
2006 directorial debut films
Films scored by Ilaiyaraaja
Best Film on Other Social Issues National Film Award winners